The Swatch FIVB World Tour 2011 is an international beach volleyball competition.

The tour consists of 17 tournaments with both genders and 5 separate gender tournaments.

Grand Slam
There are six Grand Slam tournaments and one World Championships. These events give a higher number of points and more money than the rest of the tournaments.
Beijing, China – Beijing Grand Slam, 6–11 June 2011
Rome, Italy – 2011 Beach Volleyball World Championships, 13–19 June 2011
Stavanger, Norway – ConocoPhillips Grand Slam, June 27-July 3, 2011
Gstaad, Switzerland – 1 to 1 Energy Grand Slam, 4–10 July 2011
Moscow, Russia – Grand Slam Moscow, 11–17 July 2011
Stare Jabłonki, Poland – Mazury Orlen Grand Slam, 25–31 July 2010
Klagenfurt, Austria – A1 presented by Volksbank, August 1–7, 2011

Tournament results

Women

Men

Medal table by country

References

External links

2011 Swatch FIVB World Tour - tour calendar at FIVB.org
Beachvolley at Swatch.com

 

2011 in beach volleyball
2011